Good Day was a South Korean girl group formed by C9 Entertainment, with ten members: Heejin, Genie, Cherry, Chaesol, Nayoon, Jiwon, Haeun, Viva, Bomin and Lucky. They debuted on August 30, 2017, with their first and only EP All Day Good Day.

It is said that the group has disbanded, as C9 Girlz (later named Cignature) was announced on November 11, 2019.

History

Pre-debut
In 2012, Haeun was part of a three-member girl group Littles, under Nega Network but never debuted and only released an OST for the drama The Great Seer. In 2013, Heejin competed in Superstar K5 and finished in 3rd place. Bomin appeared in movie No Breathing, as the younger version of Yuri's role. In 2015, Heejin released her debut single titled "To Reach You", which features rapper Olltii. She has also sang OSTs for dramas Late Night Restaurant and Into the Flames. Jiwon was a model under teenage fashion online shopping portal Sonyunara.

2017–2018: Debut and The Unit
In July 2017, C9 Entertainment announced the launching of their first girl group with temporary name, C9 Girls through SNS account. From July 7 to 12, the ten members were revealed and would debut as Good Day. Ahead of their debut, the group's own reality show GOOD DAY 2 U was aired from July 20 till August 10 through Naver V Live.

Good Day debuted on August 30 with their first EP All Day Good Day, with the title track "Rolly" featuring the appearance of Bae Jin-young in the music video. The EP includes three tracks from the group's units: Good Morning, Good Night and Midnight. On September 3, they have held their debut mini concert "All Day Good Day" at the Yes24 Live Hall.

6 members of the group: Heejin, Genie, Chaesol, Jiwon, Viva and Lucky were confirmed to join the reality television series The Unit. All the participating members except Lucky passed the Boot Evaluations in Episode 1. However, Lucky was brought back into the competition in Episode 4. Genie and Chaesol were eliminated in the first elimination round (Episode 7). Heejin, Viva and Lucky were eliminated in the third elimination round (Episode 13). Jiwon finished 11th in the finals, therefore not being able to be a part of UNI.T.

2019–2020: Post-disbandment; Members' re-debuts with cignature and Redsquare
On November 11, 2019, C9 Entertainment confirmed the launching of future girl group temporarily named C9 Girlz, with Jiwon, who will re-debut under the stage name Jeewon, named the first member of the future girl group. Chaesol was introduced as a member of the group on November 13. Viva, who will re-debut under the stage name Sunn, was introduced on November 14. Lucky, who will re-debut under the stage name Belle, was introduced on November 15. Haeun, who will re-debut under the stage name Ye Ah, was introduced on November 16.

On January 14, 2020, it was confirmed that the five former Good Day members aforementioned will re-debut through seven-member girl group Cignature, under C9 Entertainment's sub-label J9 Entertainment. On February 4, cignature had made their debut.

Heejin is currently part of the producing crew Solcire, and is also active as a singer-songwriter.

On May 4, 2020, it was confirmed that the four former Good Day members: Genie, Cherry, Nayoon & Bomin - who all left C9 Entertainment - will re-debut through a new five-member girl group Redsquare under About Entertainment on May 19. Cherry will re-debut under the new stage name ChaeA, while Genie will re-debut under the new stage name Green, and Nayoon will re-debut under the new stage name Ari.

Former members

Good Morning Unit
 Genie
 Nayoon
 Jiwon
 Bomin
 Lucky

Good Night Unit
 Heejin — Leader
 Haeun

Midnight Unit
 Cherry
 Chaesol
 Viva

Discography

Extended plays

Soundtrack appearances

Filmography

Music Videos

Reality and variety shows

Concert
Good Day Debut Mini Concert "All Day Good Day" (2017)

References

External links
  at C9 Entertainment 

South Korean girl groups
2017 establishments in South Korea
Musical groups established in 2017